The sixth season of the Kannada-language version of Indian reality television series Bigg Boss premiered on 21 October 2018 at 6p.m. Sudeep was the host of the show. The auditions for commoners was launched through the Voot platform in July 2018. This was the first season in Bigg Boss Kannada to feature a transgender contestant. The show was telecasted every day on Colors Super and Colors Kannada HD channels at 8p.m. IST.
Nagendra bhat was the writer for this season.

Housemates 
Along with the usual celebrity contestants, the housemates of this season include contestants selected through an online audition process. The total of eighteen housemates includes nine celebrities and nine commoners. (The following list of contestants is according to the contestants entering the house.) On Day 54 two more Housemates entered as wild card entries bringing the total number of Housemates to twenty.

House Guests 
 Niveditha Gowda, a Housemate from season 5, entered the House as a guest on Day 54 along with the wild card entries and left on Day 60. During her time in the House she was required to participate in the Week 9 nomination process.
 Krishi Thapanda, a Housemate from season 5, entered the Secret House as a guest on Day 85 as a part of a Twist.
 Keerthi Shankaraghatta (Kirik Keerthi), the Runner-up of season 4, entered the Secret House as a guest on Day 85 as a part of a Twist.
 Sanjana Chidanand, a Housemate from season 4, entered the Secret House as a guest on Day 85 as a part of a Twist.
 Pratham, the Winner of season 4, entered the Secret House as a guest on Day 85 as a part of a Twist.
 Sameer Acharya, a Housemate from season 5, entered the Secret House as a guest on Day 85 as a part of a Twist.

Nomination table

Notes

References

Bigg Boss Kannada
2018 Indian television seasons
Kannada-language television shows
Colors Kannada original programming